The A1120 is an 'A' road in the English county of Suffolk. It links Stowmarket to Yoxford passing through the centre of the county.

Route
From west to east the road passes through the following settlements:

 Stowmarket A14
 Stowupland B1115 (incorrectly labelled as B1151 on some sat-nav devices)
 Earl Stonham
 Stonham Parva A140
 Stonham Aspal
 Pettaugh B1077
 Earl Soham
 Saxtead B1119
 Dennington B1116
 Badingham B1120
 Peasenhall
 Sibton
 Yoxford A12

History

Original Cambridge route
The A1120 was the original Cambridge southern bypass, upgraded from the B1046 in the early 1930s.

Starting on the A603 Newnham Road the A1120 headed east along The Fen Causeway, which was only built in the mid-1920s (and opened as part of the B1046). A staggered crossroads took the road over the A10 Trumpington Road, after which the road ran northeastwards along Lensfield Road and East Road, to end on the A45 Newmarket Road.

In 1935, the A1120 was renumbered as an eastern extension of the A603 itself. The Fen Causeway has since been renumbered as part of the A1134 ring road, although the A603 is still here as the junior partner in a multiplex.

References

External links
 Stonham Aspal Road Safety Group

Roads in England
Roads in Suffolk